Enrico Massi (Naples, Italy, October 29, 1897 - Soyapango, El Salvador, October 4, 1923) was an Italian aviator. He is considered a pioneer of aviation in El Salvador.

Biography
His parents were Augusto Massi and Carlota Pascarella. In World War I he was a pilot and flight instructor for the Italian Royal Navy, and after the conflict, he worked as a test pilot in the Monte Celio experiment field. Later he made acrobatic presentations in Africa and Asia with Mario D´Urso, and in 1922 he was hired by Fiat S.p.A. again as a test pilot. In same year he arrived in the American continent along with other Italians at the invitation of the Honduran government, to form an aviation school, but this objective was not met.

On October 4, 1923, he was conducting an instruction flight with Juan Ramón Munés in a Caudron G.3, but the device suffered engine failures that caused his fall and the death at 11:30 in the Venice farm Soyapango. He was buried with all the honors, and a national mourning was decreed in the country.

References

1897 births
1923 deaths
Italian aviators
Italian test pilots
Aviation pioneers
Military personnel from Naples